Coffea liberica, commonly known as the Liberian coffee, is a species of flowering plant in the family Rubiaceae from which coffee is produced.  It is native to western and central Africa from Liberia to Uganda and Angola, and has become naturalised in the Philippines, Indonesia, Seychelles, the Andaman & Nicobar Islands, and Malaysia.

Description
They are harvested using ladders. The size of the cherries, the beans, and the leaves of barako are also among the largest of all coffee varieties.

The shape of the liberica beans is unique among other commercial species (arabica, robusta) and varieties (liberica var. dewevrei). It is asymmetric, with one side shorter than the other side, creating characteristic "hook" at the tip. The central furrow is also more jagged in comparison to other coffee beans.

Cultivation and use

Coffea liberica accounts for less than 1.5% of commercial coffee grown. It was first commercially cultivated in the Philippines, after it was brought to the city of Lipa in the 1740s by Spanish friars. C. liberica was the main coffee species grown in the islands during the colonial period. They were exported to Western countries where they would command prices of up to five times the prices of coffee beans from other species. During the worldwide pandemic of coffee rust in the late 19th century, C. liberica plantations in the Philippines survived longer than arabica and robusta plantations. But they too eventually succumbed to the disease, leading to the collapse of the coffee industry in the islands. It is still highly regarded and grown widely in the Philippines, though largely only for the local market. Today, Batangas and the neighboring province of Cavite are the main producers of the Philippine varietal of liberica.

At the end of the 19th century, C. liberica was also brought to Indonesia to replace the arabica trees killed by the coffee rust disease. It is still found in parts of Central and East Java and West Kalimantan today. Liberica is also cultivated in Malaysia. It is generally grown in Malaysia's Coffee Belt on the west coast of Johor largely due to Javanese immigration to Malaysia in the 19th century. A rare and one-of-a-kind cultivar of liberica can be found in a secluded area of the Amazon Rainforest of Guyana.

Liberica coffee beans are much larger than the more popular arabica and robusta beans. Due to its rarity and limited supply on a global level, the cost of regular liberica beans are on the higher end with premium liberica beans carrying a heavier price tag. The caffeine concentration of liberica beans is the lowest of the three cultivars, with 1.23 g/100 g, where arabica has 1.61 g/100 g and Robusta has 2.26 g/100 g.

Taxonomy
Coffea dewevrei, Coffea dybowskii and Coffea excelsa were formerly considered as separate species but were reclassified in 2006 as synonyms for Coffea liberica var. dewevrei.

References

External links

World Checklist of Rubiaceae
Coffea liberica, United Nations' Food and Agriculture Organization website

liberica
Flora of West Tropical Africa
Flora of West-Central Tropical Africa
Flora of Angola
Flora of Sudan
Flora of Uganda
Plants described in 1876